Metoac is an erroneous term used by some to group together the Munsee-speaking  Lenape (west), Quiripi-speaking Unquachog (center) and Pequot-speaking Montaukett (east) American Indians on what is now Long Island in New York state. The term was invented by amateur anthropologist and U.S. Congressman Silas Wood in the mistaken belief that the various native settlements on the island each comprised distinct tribes.

Instead, Indian peoples on Long Island are descended from two major language and cultural groups of the many Algonquian peoples who occupied Atlantic coastal areas from present-day Canada through the American South. The bands on Long Island in the west were related to the Lenape. Those to the east were more related culturally and linguistically to tribes of New England across Long Island Sound, such as the Pequot. Wood (and earlier colonial settlers) often confused Indian place names, by which the bands were known, as the names for different tribes living there.

Many of the place names that the Lenape and Pequot populations assigned to their villages and communities were adopted by English settlers and are still in use today. The Shinnecock Indian Nation, based in part of what is now Southampton, New York in Suffolk County, has gained federal recognition as a tribe and has a reservation there.

Etymology
"Metoac" as a collective term may have been derived by Wood from metau-hok, the Algonquian word for the rough periwinkle, the shell of which small sea snail was used to make wampum, a means of exchange which played an important role in the economy of the region before and after the arrival of Europeans.

Languages
The Native American population on Long Island has been estimated at 10,000 at the time of first contact with Europeans.  They belonged to two major nations and spoke two languages within the Algonquian language group, reflecting their different connections to mainland peoples. Native Americans in the west and in the central part of Long Island were more closely associated with bands of the same people in southwestern Connecticut, Eastern Pennsylvania, Lower Hudson Valley in New York, New Jersey and Delaware. These people spoke one of the R-dialects of the Lenape language group. Those Native Americans who lived on the east end of the island were more closely related to the Pequot of eastern Connecticut and the other Algonquian language group located around Long Island Sound. They spoke a Y-dialect of the Mohegan-Montauk-Narragansett language.

The tribes were highly decentralized and bands operated independently, establishing territory in different geographic areas.

European colonization
European colonization of the region began in the 1620s, with Dutch colonists congregating around the lower Hudson and western Long Island. The Dutch attempted to establish jurisdiction from New Amsterdam over the western portion of Long Island (including what are now the New York City boroughs of Brooklyn and Queens).

The eastern part of Long Island was colonized by English settlers of the New England Confederation. Settlers from southern New England began to migrate to Long Island's north shore in the early eighteenth century. Indigenous populations declined significantly within a few decades of European contact, due to new infectious diseases to which they had no acquired immunity.

This separation between zones of Dutch and English influence was formalized in their Treaty of Hartford in 1650, which set a border running south from Oyster Bay. The Native Americans on Long Island played an important role in the trade economy; they fashioned shells harvested there into small beads to create sewant, or wampum (wampompeag in Lenape- a term later shortened by the English). These were used to decorate ceremonial wear and were the most highly prized.

Displacement
The Pequot War (1634–1638) in southern New England and Kieft's War (1643–1645) in the New York metropolitan area were two major conflicts between the indigenous peoples and the colonists. Exposure to new Eurasian infectious diseases, such as measles and smallpox, dramatically reduced the numbers of Native Americans on Long Island. In addition, some Native American settlements on Long Island migrated away under pressure from European encroachment.  By 1659, their population was reduced to less than 500.

After the American Revolutionary War, their numbers were reduced to 162 people by 1788.  By this time, Samson Occom had persuaded many survivors to join the Brothertown Indians in western upstate New York, where the Oneida people of the Iroquois Confederacy shared their reservation for several years.

Exonyms

For generations, colonists mistakenly used the place names as exonyms for peoples, thinking they referred to distinct tribes. Among the many locations on Long Island used by the native peoples, 19th-century American publications erroneously identified the following thirteen as "tribes" on Long Island:

Metoac was a term erroneously used by amateur anthropologist and U.S. Congressman Silas Wood to describe Lenape and Pequot Native Americans on Long Island in New York state, in the belief that the various bands on the island comprised distinct tribes. He published a book in the 19th century which mistakenly claimed that several American Indian tribes were distinct to Long Island. He collectively called them the Metoac. Scholars now understand that these historic peoples were part of two major cultural groups: the Lenape and the Wappinger-Wangunk-Quinnipiac peoples, both part of the Algonquian languages family.

State and federal recognition

New York State has officially recognized the self-identified Shinnecock and the Unkechaug on Long Island as Native American tribes. The Shinnecock are based at Shinnecock Reservation near Southampton on the South Shore. The Unkechaug's Poospatuck Reservation at Mastic is the smallest Indian reservation in the state.

Since the mid-20th century, the Montaukett, Setalcott, and Matinnecock peoples have organized and established governments. All are seeking both state and federal recognition.

At the end of 2009, the administration of President Barack Obama announced the Shinnecock Indian Nation had met federal criteria as a tribe.  The Shinnecock were officially recognized by the United States government in October 2010 after a more than 30-year effort, which included suing the Department of Interior. The Acting Principal Deputy Assistant Secretary of Indian Affairs, George T. Skibine, issued the final determination of the tribe's recognized status on June 13, 2010.

References

External links
 Metoac History by Lee Sultzman

Suffolk County, New York
Nassau County, New York
Native American tribes in New York (state)
Algonquian peoples
Algonquian ethnonyms
People of New Netherland